PLM may refer to:
Pamantasan ng Lungsod ng Maynila, the University of the City of Manila
Plant lifecycle management, of industrial plant
Premier Loyalty & Marketing - a Mexican company operating Club Premier
Product lifecycle management
Product life cycle management (marketing)
Payload Module - any system or subsystem that is a part of a payload. See sample usage of the term in Solar and Heliospheric Observatory#Instruments
 (Mechanical Training Centre), later IBTE Mechanical Campus, Brunei
People's Liberation Music, a 1970s British political music group
Paide Linnameeskond, Estonian football club

Politics
Partido Lakas ng Masa, a Philippine political party
Partido Liberal Mexicano, a pre-1910 Revolution Mexican political party
Partido Laborista Mexicano, the predecessor of the Institutional Revolutionary Party of Mexico

Science
PL/M, a computer programming language

Transport
Sultan Mahmud Badaruddin II Airport, Palembang, Indonesia, IATA code
Perahu layar motor, a type of lambo (boat), Indonesia
Chemins de fer de Paris à Lyon et à la Méditerranée, a French railway company